The following is a list of Central Arkansas Bears basketball head coaches. There have been 20 head coaches of the Bears in their 101-season history.

Central Arkansas' current head coach is Anthony Boone. He was named as the Bears' permanent head coach in March of 2020, after having served as interim head coach since December of 2019. Boone replaced Russ Pennell, who took a leave of absence in December of 2019 and left for good three weeks later.

References

Central Arkansas

Central Arkansas Bears basketball coaches